Pearly or pearlie may refer to:

People
 Pearly Black (born 1967), Australian singer
 Pearly Brown (1915–1986), American singer, guitarist and street musician
 Pearlie Craft Dove (1920–2015), African-American educator
 Pearlie Mae Feldman, one of the victims of the 2001 Nevada County shootings
 Pearlie Kennedy Pettway (1920–1982), American quilter
 Pearly Tan (born 2000), Malaysian badminton player 
 Pearly Gates (singer), stage name of Viola Billups (born 1946), American disco and soul singer and member of girl group The Flirtations
 Pearlies, slang for members of the Pearly Kings and Queens charitable tradition

Arts and entertainment
 "Pearly", a Space: Above and Beyond episode
 Pearlie, an animated TV series
 Pearly, a fictional male creature in Marina, a 2004 Philippine TV series
 Damon Pearly, a fictional character in Friday After Next, a 2002 comedy film
 Pearly Spencer, a homeless man featured in the 1967 song "Days of Pearly Spencer" by David McWilliams

Places in the United States
 Pearly, Virginia, an unincorporated community
 Pearly Lake, in the town of Rindge, New Hampshire

Taxonomy
 Pearly goatfish, a species of goatfish
 Pearly hairtail, deep-water fish species in the Red Sea
 Pearly heath, butterfly species
 Pearly monocle bream, a Threadfin bream fish genus
 Pearly moray eel, a moray eel species
 Pearly mussel (disambiguation), several mussel species
 Pearly parakeet, a parakeet species
 Pearly rasbora, a fish species
 Pearly razorfish, a xyrichtys fish species
 Pearly underwing, moth species
 Pearly wood-nymph, moth species
 Pearly antshrike, a species of bird in the family Thamnophilidae
 Pearly lanternfish, Myctophum nitidulum, a species of deep sea fish

See also
 
 
 Pearly everlasting, plant genus
 Pearly-eye, butterfly genus
 Pearly-finned cardinalfish, a species of cardinalfish
 Pearly skin puddle frog, frog species
 Pearly Gates (disambiguation)
 Pearly penile papules, human male genital skin condition
 Purley (disambiguation)
 Perły, a village in northern Poland
 Pearl (disambiguation)

Animal common name disambiguation pages